The Northrop N-102 Fang was a fighter aircraft design created by Northrop Corporation and proposed to the United States Air Force in 1953.

Design and development
In the early 1950s, concerns grew in the United States about the growing weight, complexity and cost of modern fighter aircraft, and in late 1952, Northrop started a design study for a simple, lightweight, supersonic fighter aircraft, the N-102 Fang, with the design team headed by Welko E. Gasich, Northrop's Chief of Advanced Design. On 12 December that year, the United States Air Force (USAF) issued a requirement for a lightweight air superiority aircraft to replace the F-100 supersonic fighter. Northrop proposed the N-102 to meet the requirement, while other competitors were from Lockheed (the CL-246), North American Aviation (the NA-212) and Republic Aviation (the AP-55).

The N-102 had a shoulder-mounted delta wing and a small all-moving tailplane mounted behind the wing. It would be powered by a single turbojet mounted in the lower aft fuselage which was supplied by air from a variable-geometry ventral air inlet. This promised smoother, more efficient airflow to the engine at the risk of being more vulnerable to ingestion of foreign objects and damage to the engine. A number of different engines were proposed, including the Pratt & Whitney J57, the Wright J65 (a license-produced derivative of the British Armstrong Siddeley Sapphire), the Wright J67 (a license-built Bristol Olympus or the General Electric J79, with all of the engines giving an estimated speed of at least Mach 2. 

In early 1953, the USAF selected Lockheed's CL-246, which became the Lockheed F-104 Starfighter, but Northrop at first continued work on the N-102 with the hope of gaining export orders, building a mock-up of the aircraft in USAF colors. However, the use of a single, large engine meant that the aircraft could not be as light or cheap as Northrop wanted, and Northrop stopped work on the N-102 during 1954. Northrop continued work on lightweight fighters, basing its further studies on the use of two small General Electric J85 engines, which allowed a much lighter and cheaper aircraft, with Northrop's design team believing that twin engines would increase the reliability and safety margin. The J85-powered design studies eventually formed the  basis of the F-5 fighter family.

The design was the subject of a 1957 design patent.

Specifications (J79 engine - performance estimated)

See also

References

 
 
 

High-wing aircraft
N-102
Single-engined jet aircraft